The fifty-fourth edition of the Caribbean Series (Serie del Caribe) baseball competition was played in 2012. It was held from February 2 through February 7 with the champions teams from Dominican Republic (Leones del Escogido), Puerto Rico (Indios de Mayagüez), Venezuela (Tigres de Aragua) and Mexico (Yaquis de Obregón). The format consisted of twelve games, in a double round-robin format with each team facing each other twice. The games were played at Estadio Quisqueya in Santo Domingo, Dominican Republic.

Final standings

Individual leaders

All-Star Team

Scoreboards

Game 1, February 2

Game 2, February 2

Game 3, February 3

Game 4, February 3

Game 5, February 4

Game 6, February 4

Game 7, February 5

Game 8, February 5

Game 9, February 6

Game 10, February 6

Game 11, February 7

Game 12, February 7

Sources

Caribbean Series
Caribbean
2012 in Caribbean sport
International baseball competitions hosted by the Dominican Republic
February 2012 sports events in North America
Sports competitions in Santo Domingo
21st century in Santo Domingo